Rostellularia is a genus of flowering plants belonging to the family Acanthaceae.

Its native range is Northeastern Tropical Africa, Madagascar, Southern Arabian Peninsula, Tropical and Subtropical Asia to Australia.

Species:

Rostellularia adscendens 
Rostellularia andamanica 
Rostellularia ardjunensis 
Rostellularia assamica 
Rostellularia backeri 
Rostellularia bankaoensis 
Rostellularia brachystachya 
Rostellularia chiengmaiensis 
Rostellularia diffusa 
Rostellularia hayatae 
Rostellularia hedyotidifolia 
Rostellularia hijangensis 
Rostellularia humilis 
Rostellularia lanceolata 
Rostellularia latispica 
Rostellularia linearifolia 
Rostellularia mollissima 
Rostellularia nagpurensis 
Rostellularia obtusa 
Rostellularia ovata 
Rostellularia palustris 
Rostellularia procumbens 
Rostellularia psychotrioides 
Rostellularia quinqueangularis 
Rostellularia rachaburensis 
Rostellularia royeniana 
Rostellularia serpyllifolia 
Rostellularia simplex 
Rostellularia smeruensis

References

Acanthaceae
Acanthaceae genera